Joseph Laurent (1839–1917), was an Abenaki chief, best known for authoring an Abenaki language dictionary. He also established a trading post in New Hampshire that is listed in the National Register of Historic Places.

Biography

Laurent was chief of the Abenaki reserve of Odanak in Quebec, Canada, from 1880 to 1892. He was a teacher and leader in his Algonquian community, and the Odanak Nation throughout his life. Laurent is best known for the publication of his book New Familiar Abenakis and English Dialogues. The book is a dictionary that translates Abenaki to English, and was the first of its kind.  The structure of the dictionary is what widely sets it apart from others. His translations are set up as a journey through their land as opposed to a standard list. He takes the reader on a trip from Quebec and throughout New England through linguistics and language education. Despite Laurent's upbringing of speaking fluent Abenaki and French, he not only created a dictionary to teach English to Abenaki people, he more importantly created the substantial text in an effort to preserve the Abenaki language and culture. The Abenaki language was oral, and little to no written documents had been recorded. New Familiar Abenakis and English Dialogues was vital in taking the number of a hundred-plus speakers to the rest of the Abenaki population as they continued to be a part of an English-speaking world, and it is still widely used today.

Laurent was also an entrepreneur. He purchased goods from Odanak members and took them to his trading post in Intervale, New Hampshire, to sell to tourists. The camp was located in a grove of white pines known as Cathedral Woods, across from the scenic overlook that resides on the border of North Conway and Intervale. They sold things like baskets, Victorian goods, and miniatures. It was not only a business opportunity, but was also a way for his family to practice speaking English. The trading post remained for 33 years, until Laurent's death in 1917. In 1991, the trading post was listed in the National Register of Historic Places as "Abenaki Indian Shop and Camp".

Stephen Laurent (1909–2001), the youngest of Joseph Laurent's 18 children, was also an accomplished writer/linguist, and resided in Intervale from 1940 until his death.

References

Further reading

External links
 New Familiar Abenakis and English Dialogues, the first ever published on the grammatical system (1884)
 "Western Abenaki Dictionary, WAR Radio, and Online Lessons: Home of the Abenaki Language." Accessed March 31, 2015.

1839 births
1917 deaths
Abenaki people
Writers from Quebec
19th-century First Nations writers